Bahram Bayg (also Romanized as Bahrām Bayg; also known as Bahrām Beg) is a village in Gowavar Rural District, Govar District, Gilan-e Gharb County, Kermanshah Province, Iran. At the 2006 census, its population was 131, in 26 families.

References 

Populated places in Gilan-e Gharb County